Hebrews 8 is the eighth chapter of the Epistle to the Hebrews in the New Testament of the Christian Bible. The author is anonymous, although the internal reference to "our brother Timothy" (Hebrews 13:23) causes a traditional attribution to Paul, but this attribution has been disputed since the second century and there is no decisive evidence for the authorship. This chapter contains the exposition about the better ministry of the New Covenant.

Background
This chapter appears under the subheading "Jesus, High Priest of a Better Covenant" in the ESV and "Mediator of a Better Covenant" in the NRSV English language translations of the New Testament.

Text
The original text was written in Koine Greek. This chapter is divided into 13 verses.

Textual witnesses
Some early manuscripts containing the text of this chapter are:
Papyrus 46 (175–225; complete)
Codex Vaticanus (325-350)
Codex Sinaiticus (330-360)
Codex Alexandrinus (400-440)
Codex Freerianus (~450; extant verses 1-2, 7-11, 18-20, 27-28)
Codex Claromontanus (~550)

Old Testament references
 Hebrews 8:5: 
 : Jeremiah 31:31–34

The Work of the Heavenly High Priest (8:1–7)
This section serves as an introduction to the homily about the New Covenant based on Jeremiah 31:31-34.

Verse 1
New King James Version
 Now this is the main point of the things we are saying: We have such a High Priest, who is seated at the right hand of the throne of the Majesty in the heavens,

Verse 2
New King James Version
 Minister of the sanctuary and of the true tabernacle which the Lord erected, and not man.

Verse 5
 who serve the copy and shadow of the heavenly things, as Moses was divinely instructed when he was about to make the tabernacle. For He said, "See that you make all things according to the pattern shown you on the mountain."
Citing

The Text for a Homily (8:8–13)
Following the introduction, oracle in Jeremiah 31:31-34 is discussed as the word of God (according to NRSV; the text of Jeremiah also claims 'the Lord' as the speaker).

Verse 13
New King James Version
 In that He says, "A new covenant," He has made the first obsolete. Now what is becoming obsolete and growing old is ready to vanish away.

See also
Abraham
High priest
Jesus Christ
Judah (biblical person)
Levi
Melchizedek
Moses
New Covenant
Related Bible parts: Exodus 25, Jeremiah 31

References

Bibliography

External links
 King James Bible - Wikisource
English Translation with Parallel Latin Vulgate
Online Bible at GospelHall.org (ESV, KJV, Darby, American Standard Version, Bible in Basic English)
Multiple bible versions at Bible Gateway (NKJV, NIV, NRSV etc.)

08